Andrei Florin Țepeș-Bobu (born 23 February 1991) is a Romanian footballer who plays as a defender for AFC Odorheiu Secuiesc.

Honours
CS Gheorgheni
Liga IV – Harghita County: Winner (1) 2018–19

References

External links 
 
 

1991 births
Living people
People from Gheorgheni
Romanian footballers
Association football defenders
Liga I players
Liga II players
CSM Ceahlăul Piatra Neamț players
FC Botoșani players
Sepsi OSK Sfântu Gheorghe players
FK Csíkszereda Miercurea Ciuc players
Romanian football managers